Motorsport, motorsports or autosports is a global term used to encompass the group of competitive sporting events which primarily involve the use of motorized vehicles. The terminology can also be used to describe forms of competition of two-wheeled motorised vehicles under the banner of motorcycle racing, and includes off-road racing such as motocross.

Four- (or more) wheeled motorsport competition is globally governed by the Fédération Internationale de l'Automobile (FIA); and the Fédération Internationale de Motocyclisme (FIM) governs two-wheeled competition. Likewise, the Union Internationale Motonautique (UIM) governs powerboat racing while the Fédération Aéronautique Internationale (FAI) governs air sports, including aeroplane racing. All vehicles that participate in motorsports must adhere to the regulations that are set out by the respective global governing body. Famous is the Race of Champions, the only competition in the world where stars from Formula One, World Rally Championship, IndyCar, NASCAR, sportscars and touring cars compete against each other, going head-to-head in identical cars.

History

In 1894, a French newspaper organised a race from Paris to Rouen and back, starting city to city racing. In 1900, the Gordon Bennett Cup was established. Closed circuit racing arose as open road racing, on public roads, was banned.

Aspendale Racecourse in Australia in 1906 was the first dedicated motor racing track in the world.

Following World War I, European countries organised Grand Prix races over closed courses. In the United States, dirt track racing became popular.

After World War II, the Grand Prix circuit became more formally organised. In the United States, stock car racing and drag racing became firmly established.

Motorsports ultimately became divided by types of motor vehicles into racing events, and their appropriate organisations.

Auto racing

Open wheel racing

Formula racing

Formula racing is a set of classes of motor vehicles, with their wheels outside, and not contained by, any bodywork of their vehicle. These have been globally classified as specific 'Formula' series - the most common being Formula One, and Formula Two. Many others include the likes of Formula 3, Formula Ford, Formula Renault and Formula Palmer Audi. However, in North America, the IndyCar series is the most followed open-wheeled racing series. Former 'Formula' series include Formula 5000, GP2 and GP3.

Formula One

Formula One is a class of single-seat and open-wheel Grand Prix closed course racing, governed by the Fédération Internationale de l'Automobile (FIA), and currently organized by the privately owned company Formula One Group. The formula regulations contain a very strict set of rules which govern vehicle power, weight, size, and design. The rules do allow for some variation, however.

Formula E

Formula E is a class of open-wheel auto racing that uses only electric-powered cars. The series was conceived in 2012, and the inaugural championship started in Beijing on 13 September 2014. The series is also sanctioned by the FIA and races a spec chassis/battery combination, with manufacturers allowed to develop their own electric power-trains. The series has gained significant traction in recent years.

IndyCar Series

A series originated on June 12, 1909, in Portland, Oregon at its first race. Its premier race is the Indianapolis 500 which began on May 11, 1911, and a tradition was born. Today, IndyCar operates a full schedule with over 20 teams and 40 different drivers. The current schedule includes 15 tracks over the course of 17 races per season. Will Power was crowned the current champion of the IndyCar Series in September 2022.

Enclosed wheel racing
Enclosed wheel racing is a set of classes of vehicles, where the wheels are primarily enclosed inside the bodywork of the vehicle, similar to a North American 'stock car'.

Sports car racing

Sports car racing is a set of classes of vehicles, over a closed course track, including GT sports cars, and specialized racing prototypes. The premiere race is the 24 Hours of Le Mans which takes place annually in France during the month of June. Sports car racing rules and specifications differentiate in North America from established international sanctioning bodies.

Stock car racing

Stock car racing is a set of vehicles that race over a speedway track, organized by NASCAR. While once stock cars, the vehicles are now purpose-built, but resemble the body design and shape of production cars. Bootleggers throughout the Carolinas are often credited for the origins of NASCAR due to the resistance during prohibition. Many of the vehicles were modified to increase top speed and handling, to provide the bootleggers with an advantage toward the vehicles local law enforcement would use in the area. An important part to the modifications of stock cars, was to increase the performance of the vehicle while also maintaining the same exterior. Many legends in NASCAR originated as bootleggers in the Great Smoky Mountains of North Carolina, like Junior Johnson. Organized oval racing began on Daytona Beach in Florida as a hobby, but quickly gained interest from all over the country. As oval racing became larger and larger, a group gathered in hopes to form a sanctioning body for the sport. NASCAR was organized in 1947, to combine flat track oval racing of production cars. Daytona Beach and Road Course was founded where land speed records were set on the beach, and included part of A1A. The highlight of the stock car calendar is the season-opening Daytona 500, also nicknamed 'The Great American Race' which is held at Daytona International Speedway in Daytona Beach, Florida. NASCAR has now held over 2,500 sanctioned events over the course of 70 seasons. Richard Petty is known as the king of NASCAR with over 200 recorded wins in the series and has competed in 1,184 races in his career.

Touring car racing 

Touring car racing is a set of vehicles, modified street cars, that race over closed purpose built race tracks and street courses.

Off-road racing

Off-road racing is a group of vehicles that specialize in off-road racing and are modified street cars that can race on close purpose-built off-road tracks and courses. Off-road racing is popular all over the world. Premier off-road events include the Dakar Rally and the Baja 1000 desert race. Series like the National Off-Road Racing Association (NORRA) which was founded in 1967, sanctions events utilizing off-road vehicles racing through the Baja Desert. The first event sanctioned by the organization was the 1967 Mexican 1000 rally that began in Tijuana and ended in La Paz.

Since the 1990s, the FIA has relentlessly pushed for off roading and other off-tarmac racing to be strictly governed by their regulations and standards. This move was done in order to curb the extensive damage to both human life and equipment that unregulated off-roading had caused. All FIA member countries have now passed legislation stating that any vehicle that partakes in off-roading, be it a local level or recreational level, must comply with basic Class 1 FIA rally racing standards, in order to ensure the safety of the participants and equipment.

Other forms of motor racing

Motor sports which involve competitors racing against each other include:
Air racing
Motorboat racing
Drone racing
Hovercraft racing
Kart racing
Lawn mower racing
Motorcycle racing
Radio-controlled model racing
Slot car racing
Snowmobile racing
Truck racing

Non-racing disciplines
Forms of motorsport which do not involve racing include demolition derby, drifting, gymkhana, freestyle motocross, monster truck events, motorcycle trials, regularity rally and tractor pulling.

Officiating
Racing events are governed by various race officials. Examples of various roles include race director, scorer, chief steward. Race officials are typically members of the country's motorsport governing organization and represent their rules and regulations.

Throughout the racing event, officials are responsible for organizing logistics, onboarding participants, safety, scoring, arbitration, and any other support activities.

After the race, the officials are responsible for resolving any issues that may have arisen during the race. Parties can appeal the decisions to the country's motorsport governing organization.

Olympics
Motorsport was a demonstration event at the 1900 Summer Olympics.

See also

Electric motorsport
International Motorsports Hall of Fame
List of motorsport championships
Long Beach Motorsports Walk of Fame
Motorsports Hall of Fame of America

Footnotes

References

External links

 
Formula 1 (F1)
Motorsports Association (UK)
World Rally Championship (WRC)

 
Racing
Individual sports
Sports by type